The Beardmore W.B.VI was a British single-engined folding wing torpedo bomber biplane of World War I developed by Beardmore.

Specifications (variant)

References

1910s British bomber aircraft
Carrier-based aircraft
Biplanes
W.B.VI